Aniebiet Inyang Ntui is a Nigerian diplomat and professor who has served as the Ambassador of the EU's European Climate Pact since December 2022.

She was named by the Web of Science as the "Most Read Researcher in Nigeria"  and is the current University Librarian of the University of Calabar. She is the third woman in the 45-year history of the university to hold the position.

She chaired panels at the 2022 United Nations Biodiversity Conference in Montreal, Canada, the 2022 G20 Bali Summit in Indonesia, the 2022 United Nations Climate Change Conference in Sharm el-Sheikh, Egypt, the United Nations Water Summit on Groundwater, held at the UNESCO Headquarters, Paris, and the 2023 World Economic Forum in Davos, Switzerland.

Education
Aniebiet holds a Bachelor of Science Degree in Science Education (Botany) from the University of Cross River State, Uyo, a Diploma in Computer Techniques and Applications from the University of Ibadan, a Master of Education Degree from the University of Calabar, a Master of Library, Archival and Information Science from the University of Ibadan and a Ph.D. in Library and Information Science from the University of Uyo.

Career
As well as holding the title of being the University of Calabar's Librarian, Aniebiet is also a professor of Library and Information Science  at the institution, with more than two decades worth of experience in the lecture room and library. She was appointed as the Chief Executive of the University of Calabar Library, the 5th Substantive University Librarian in February 2022 by the Governing Council of the Institution headed by General Martin Luther Agwai.

She was named in August 2022 as the Most Read Researcher in Nigeria by the Web of Science with over 500,000 reads on the ResearchGate Platform.  She was appointed by the European Union (EU) as a Stakeholder Member of the Polifonia Project   and an Associate Member of the European Union Research Initiative, Europeana.

She is an Overseas Associate Member of the University of the West of Scotland's Centre for African Research on Enterprise and Economic Development and the University of Glasgow's UK-COP 26 Universities Climate Network. She is the recipient of the Leaders in Law 2022 UK Global Prize as "the Education Services Expert of the Year in Nigeria".

Her advocacy as a Member of the UNCBD Women's Caucus led to a Rio Convention for the first time in its 30-year history to adopt a stand-alone target on gender equality in the Kunming-Montreal Global Biodiversity Framework during the 2022 United Nations Biodiversity Conference

In December 2022, she was appointed to serve as the Ambassador of the EU's European Climate Pact, the European Climate Pact is the initiative of the European Commission supporting the implementation of the European Green Deal.

Controversy
In October, an article emerged which claimed that Professor Aniebiet was "set" to endorse the Presidential Candidate of the Nigerian Labor Party, Peter Obi ahead of the 2023 Nigerian Elections. Other articles went further to claim that Aniebiet will be the Minister of Education in the “Obi-Datti administration”. Later that week, Professor Aniebiet through a statement released in the City of Calabar said she has no plans to endorse any political party or candidate ahead of the 2023 general elections, she also noted that she has no interest in “any divisive issues or any political appointments” from the Labor Party. Her statement ignited a strong response from supporters of the Youth 'Obidient' movement who took to various social media platforms to criticize her.

Publications
 Noise Sources and Levels at the University of Calabar Library. African Journal of Library, Archives and Information Science.
 Library Services Delivery in Africa during and after COVID-19 Pandemic: Call to Action & Guide for African Libraries & Librarians. Library Aid Africa.
 Leveraging Developing Economies with the Use of Information Technology: Trends and Tools. IGI Global.
 Motivation as Correlates of Work Attitude of Library Staff in Tertiary Institutions’ Libraries in Cross River State, Nigeria. Journal of Library and Information Science.
 Gender Disparity in Science, Technology & Mathematics in Nigeria. The Paragon, A Journal of the National Association of Women Academics.
 Mobile Phone Etiquette in Nigeria: The Case of Calabar Municipality, Nigeria. IRMA.
 Funding and Library Resources in Government Owned University Libraries in Nigeria. Semantic Scholar.
 Examining the Attitude of Library and Information Science (LIS) Students in University of Calabar (Unical) towards Entrepreneurship. The International Institute for Science, Technology and Education (IISTE).
 Integrating Information Communication Technologies (ICT) with Information Literacy & Library-Use-Instructions in Nigerian Universities. Zenodo.
 Economic Challenges and Prospects Associated with the Utilization of Information and Communication Technology (ICT) for Library Services in Universities in Cross River State, Nigeria. EBSCO Information Services.
 Developing Strategies for Effective Knowledge Management (KM) in University Libraries in Nigeria. ResearchGate
 Role of Library in Conflict and Peace Process in Bakassi Area of Nigeria. Bepress.

See also
 Boma Obi
 Jessica Gardner
 Victoria Okojie
 Peter Gregory Obi
 Lenrie Olatokunbo Aina
 Andrea Joana-Maria Wiktorin
 Małgorzata Wasilewska

References 

Ambassadors of the European Union
Nigerian diplomats
University of Ibadan alumni
University of Uyo alumni
University of Calabar alumni
Living people
Year of birth missing (living people)